Gratzer may refer to:

People
 David Gratzer, Canadian physician and writer
 George Grätzer, Hungarian Canadian mathematician and author
 Walter Gratzer (1932-2021), British biophysical chemist
 Wolfgang Gratzer, Austrian musicologist

Other
 Grätzer, a Polish beer style